Flavio Torti (died 1622) was a lawyer and writer, active in his native Pavia and also in Milan. He was prince of the Accademia di Affidati in Milan.

Biography
Born in Pavia or Castelnuovo Scrivia He belonged to a family with a number of lawyers. The Senate of Milan awarded him the position of primary professor of Canon and Civil law at the University of Pavia, a position he held for 30 years. He worked as counselor and auditor of the Inquisition of Milan. He wrote a multivolume commentary on the works of medieval jurist Baldo degli Ubaldi (1327 – 1400) titled Annotationes, seu Lucubrationes ad statuta inclytae civitatis Papiae published in 1617.

References 

Annotationes, seu Lucubrationes ad statuta inclytae civitatis Papiae By Flavio Torti (1617).

17th-century Italian lawyers
17th-century Latin-language writers
1622 deaths
People from Pavia